Elections were held in the Australian state of Western Australia on 28 June 1904 to elect 50 members to the state's Legislative Assembly.

The election resulted in a hung parliament. The Labour Party, led by Robert Hastie, won 22 seats, while the governing Ministerialists won 18 seats, and independents won 10 seats. Walter James, who had been premier since July 1902, initially continued on in the role after the election. The Labour Party elected a new leader, Henry Daglish, on 8 July. Daglish successfully moved a motion of no confidence on 2 August, and after James's resignation became premier on 10 August. He was Western Australia's first premier from the Labour Party.

Results

|}

See also
 Members of the Western Australian Legislative Assembly, 1901–1904
 Members of the Western Australian Legislative Assembly, 1904–1905

Notes
 The total number of enrolled voters was 163,826, of whom 25,511 were registered in ten uncontested seats. Five of the uncontested seats were won by Labour, three by Ministerialists, and two by independents.

References

Elections in Western Australia
1904 elections in Australia
June 1904 events
1900s in Western Australia